The Hillsboro Canal is located in the southeastern portion of Florida within the South Florida Water Management District, and for much of its length forms the border between Broward and Palm Beach counties; however, its western end was entirely in Palm Beach County, until being recently annexed to Broward County-Parkland, FL .  It begins at Lake Okeechobee at the S-2 water control structure in South Bay west of Belle Glade, Florida. It passes within the southern border of the Loxahatchee National Wildlife Refuge and flows southeast from there along Loxahatchee Road in a rural, lightly populated area.  When it reaches the more heavily built-up region further east, it bends to head due eastward, forming the county line.  Near its eastern end at the Intracoastal Waterway, with Boca Raton to the north and Deerfield Beach to the south, it departs from its straight course to go around several curves, but the county boundary continues to follow it at this point.  10 miles of the canal is navigable, and it is popular for recreational boating and fishing.

Restoration of the Everglades efforts include treatment to remove elevated levels of nutrients. As a part of this restoration effort, Hillsboro Canal flow was diverted at the Loxahatchee Refuge in 2001 to a wetland stormwater treatment area, STA-2, which discharges into Water Conservation Area 2.

References 

Canals in Florida
Transportation buildings and structures in Palm Beach County, Florida
Transportation buildings and structures in Broward County, Florida